In chemistry, fractional crystallization is a method of refining substances based on differences in their solubility. It fractionates via differences in crystallization (forming of crystals). If a mixture of two or more substances in solution are allowed to crystallize, for example by allowing the temperature of the solution to decrease or increase, the precipitate will contain more of the least soluble substance. The proportion of components in the precipitate will depend on their solubility products. If the solubility products are very similar, a cascade process will be needed to effectuate a complete separation.    
This technique is often used in chemical engineering to obtain pure substances, or to recover saleable products from waste solutions.
Fractional crystallization can be used to separate solid-solid mixtures. An example of this is separating KNO3 and KClO3.

See also

 Cold Water Extraction
 Fractional crystallization (geology)
 Fractional freezing
 Laser-heated pedestal growth
 Pumpable ice technology
 Recrystallization (chemistry)
 Seed crystal
 Single crystal

References

 "Small Molecule Crystalization" (PDF) at Illinois Institute of Technology website

Fractionation
Phase transitions
Methods of crystal growth